John Ball Primary School is a 3–11 mixed, community primary school in Blackheath, London, England. It is named after the 14th century Lollard priest, John Ball, who preached to participants in the Peasants' Revolt on Blackheath.

History 

The main building was opened in 1953, and a purpose-built Early Years Unit was added in early 2001. In 2010, a new Music block was opened, and a new Year 6 block opened in 2011.

In 2014/5 a £4.5M building project was completed to permanently expand the school to 3 forms of entry. This involved the building of a new admin and central facilities block, a wing of 5 new classrooms, the extension of a new classroom to the Early Years building. The outdoor play space, nursery class, and small hall were also refurbished. The school also brought in a bulge class of reception children in Sept 2015, meaning a 120 pupil year group.

Uniform 
John Ball Primary School is unusual among British schools for not having a required school uniform. However, students can purchase sweatshirts, polo shirts, tee shirts, book bags, and gym bags with the school logo on.

Demographics 
Around 44% of students are white British. Approximately 20% of pupils speak English as an additional language and 18% of pupils were eligible for free school meals. In 2010, 20.4% of pupils had special educational needs.

Notable alumni 
 Jude Law, actor
 Dominic Cooper, actor

References

External links
 

Primary schools in the London Borough of Lewisham
Community schools in the London Borough of Lewisham